is a Japanese manga series written and illustrated by Hideo Iura. It is the story about Takeda Masami, a new lawyer and fellow lawyer Kuzu Motohito, who Takeda is teamed up with, and how they deal with different court cases. It was serialized in Big Comic Original from 2003 to 2009. Shogakukan compiled it into ten tankōbon volumes released between July 30, 2004, and January 29, 2010. A second series, was published from 2010 to 2014; its first volume was released on December 25, 2010.

In 2007, Bengoshi no Kuzu won the 52nd Shogakukan Manga Award in the General category.

The manga was adapted into a 12-episode TV drama, which was broadcast on Tokyo Broadcasting System between April 13, 2006, and June 29, 2006.

Cast
Etsushi Toyokawa as Kuzu Motohito
Hideaki Itō as Takeda Masami
Aki Hoshino as Omata Yuka
Fuyuki Moto as Kunimitsu Yuujiro
Soichiro Kitamura as Shiraishi Makoto
Reiko Takashima as Kato Tetsuko

Awards
49th Television Drama Academy Awards Best Leading Actor: Toyokawa Etsushi
49th Television Drama Academy Awards Best Supporting Actor: Hideaki Itō

References

External links
Official TBS Bengoshi no Kuzu website 

2003 manga
2006 Japanese television series debuts
2006 Japanese television series endings
2010 manga
Japanese television dramas based on manga
Manga adapted into television series
Seinen manga
Shogakukan manga
TBS Television (Japan) dramas
Winners of the Shogakukan Manga Award for general manga